The P B Lawrence Stakes, registered as the J J Liston Stakes, is a Melbourne Racing Club Group 2 Thoroughbred horse race held under weight for age conditions, for horses aged three years old and upwards, over a distance of 1400 metres, held at Caulfield Racecourse, Melbourne, Australia in August. Total prize money for the race is A$300,000.

History

The inaugural running of the race in 1949 was run at Flemington Racecourse over a distance of one mile and was won by the English bred horse One Up.

Name
The race name from 1949 to 2010 was the J J Liston Stakes, named after J. J. Liston (a prominent horse owner and president of the Williamstown Race Club).  In 2011 the race name was changed to honour Peter B. Lawrence, who served 12 years as Chairman of the MRC.

Distance
1949–1964 – 1 mile (~1600m)
1965–1972 - 7 furlongs (~1400m)
1973 onwards – 1400 metres

Grade
1949–1978 – Principal Race
1979 onwards Group 2

Venue
1949–1964 – Flemington Racecourse 
1965–1983 – Sandown Park Racecourse
 1984 – Caulfield Racecourse 
1985–1996 – Sandown Park Racecourse
 1997 – Caulfield Racecourse 
1998–2001 – Sandown Park Racecourse
2002 onwards – Caulfield Racecourse

Winners

 2022 – Mr Brightside
 2021 – Sierra Sue
 2020 – Savatiano
 2019 – Mystic Journey
 2018 – Showtime
 2017 – Hartnell
 2016 – Miss Rose De Lago
 2015 – Mourinho
 2014 – Star Rolling
 2013 – Puissance De Lune
 2012 – Second Effort
 2011 – Whobegotyou
 2010 – Shoot Out
 2009 – Predatory Pricer
 2008 – Light Fantastic
 2007 – Apache Cat
 2006 – Pompeii Ruler
 2005 – Lad Of The Manor
 2004 – Regal Roller
 2003 – Super Elegant
 2002 – Sports
 2001 – Le Zagaletta
 2000 – Skoozi Please
 1999 – Inaflury
 1998 – Vonanne
 1997 – Happy Star
 1996 – Delsole
 1995 – Baryshnikov
 1994 – Mahogany
 1993 – Bundy Lad
 1992 – Jim's Mate
 1991 – Dr.Grace
 1990 – Sydeston
 1989 – Kairau Lad
 1988 – My Steely Dan
 1987 – Military Plume
 1986 – Luther's Luck
 1985 – King Delamere
 1984 – Bow Mistress
 1983 – Pleach
 1982 – Cobra
 1981 – Sovereign Red
 1980 – Grey Sapphire
 1979 – Waitangirua
 1978 – So Called
 1977 – Vice Regal
 1976 – Bold Mayo
 1975 – Wave King
 1974 – Brandy Balloon
 1973 – Zambari
 1972 – Tauto
 1971 – Tauto
 1970 – Regal Vista
 1969 – Maritana
 1968 – Winfreux
 1967 – Stellar Belle
 1966 – Tobin Bronze
 1965 – Samson 
 1964 – Craftsman
 1963 – Nicopolis
 1962 – My Peak
 1961 – Anonyme
 1960 – My Peak
 1959 – Gay Saba
 1958 – Lord
 1957 – Syntax
 1956 – Cyklon King
 1955 – Cromis
 1954 – Clear Springs
 1953 – Bytact
 1952 – Ellerslie
 1951 – Chicquita
 1950 – Clement
 1949 – One Up

See also
 List of Australian Group races
 Group races

References

Horse races in Australia
Caulfield Racecourse